Fiction and Other Truths: A Film About Jane Rule is a Canadian documentary film, directed by Lynne Fernie and Aerlyn Weissman and released in 1995. The film is a portrait of influential lesbian writer and anti-censorship activist Jane Rule.

The film premiered on January 9, 1995 at the St. Lawrence Centre for the Arts in Toronto, at a gala benefit for the Canadian Lesbian and Gay Archives, before having its television premiere as the debut episode of TVOntario's documentary series The View from Here on January 11. It subsequently screened theatrically elsewhere in Canada, including at a benefit screening for Little Sister's Book and Art Emporium in Vancouver during its censorship dispute with the Canada Border Services Agency.

The film won the Genie Award for Best Short Documentary at the 16th Genie Awards in 1996.

References

External links
 

1995 films
1995 documentary films
1995 LGBT-related films
Canadian short documentary films
Canadian LGBT-related short films
Documentary films about lesbians
Documentary films about women writers
Best Short Documentary Film Genie and Canadian Screen Award winners
1990s short documentary films
1990s English-language films
1990s Canadian films